West Alto Bonito is a census-designated place (CDP) in Starr County, Texas, United States. The population was 696 in 2010 census. Prior to the 2010 census West Alto Bonito CDP was known as Alto Bonito CDP.

Geography
West Alto Bonito is located at  (26.314299, -98.661723).

According to the United States Census Bureau, the CDP has a total area of 0.1 square mile (0.3 km), all land.

Demographics
At the 2000 census there were 569 people, 128 households, and 120 families in the CDP. The population density was 4,692.8 people per square mile (1,830.8/km). There were 153 housing units at an average density of 1,261.9/sq mi (492.3/km).  The racial makeup of the CDP was 95.25% White, 2.64% Pacific Islander, 2.11% from other races. Hispanic or Latino of any race were 97.36%.

Of the 128 households 73.4% had children under the age of 18 living with them, 80.5% were married couples living together, 9.4% had a female householder with no husband present, and 5.5% were non-families. 5.5% of households were one person and 2.3% were one person aged 65 or older. The average household size was 4.45 and the average family size was 4.62.

The age distribution was 44.1% under the age of 18, 13.4% from 18 to 24, 30.1% from 25 to 44, 10.0% from 45 to 64, and 2.5% 65 or older. The median age was 20 years. For every 100 females, there were 109.2 males. For every 100 females age 18 and over, there were 93.9 males.

The median household income was $17,396 and the median family income  was $17,396. Males had a median income of $17,857 versus $16,250 for females. The per capita income for the CDP was $3,717. About 71.9% of families and 75.0% of the population were below the poverty line, including 79.5% of those under age 18 and none of those age 65 or over.

Education
West Alto Bonito is served by the Rio Grande City Grulla Independent School District (formerly Rio Grande City Consolidated Independent School District)

References

Census-designated places in Starr County, Texas
Census-designated places in Texas